Oliver Tompsett (born 25 August 1981) is a British actor and singer. He is best known for his portrayal of Fiyero in the West End production of the musical Wicked, and for playing the role of Galileo in the West End Smash hit We Will Rock You.

Biography 
Tompsett trained at Arts Educational School, and during his final year he played: "Cinderella's Prince" in Into the Woods; "Tommy" in The Who's Tommy and "Tony" in West Side Story.

Tompsett made his professional and West End debut in October 2002 in the Madness/Tim Firth musical Our House, directed by Matthew Warchus, at London's Cambridge Theatre. He is featured on the DVD of the production, recorded for BBC3 in 2003, as the character Callum and as a member of the ensemble.

His subsequent London stage appearances include: Benny Andersson and Björn Ulvaeus' Mamma Mia!, directed by Phyllida Lloyd, at the Prince of Wales Theatre; Notes From New York at the Trafalgar Studios and Christmas in New York at the Apollo Theatre, both directed by David Randall; 'Caliph' in Kismet, directed by Tiffany Watt-Smith, at the Arcola Theatre and "Harry Lytton" in Richard Stirling's Over My Shoulder: The Story of Jessie Matthews, directed by Stewart Nicholls, at Wyndhams Theatre.

Immediately prior to joining the original cast of Wicked, in September 2006, he appeared in Trevor Nunn's production of Peter Shaffer's The Royal Hunt of the Sun at the National Theatre. He has twice appeared on the Royal Variety Performance, in 2002 and 2006.

Tompsett next played the role of Fiyero in the West End musical Wicked, which opened 27 September 2006. He is a member of the original London cast, having previously performed in the ensemble and serving as the understudy for Fiyero, before replacing Adam Garcia on 16 July 2007. He played his final performance on 27 March 2010 after three and a half years with the production. He was succeeded by Lewis Bradley who played the role until May 2010, when Lee Mead took over.

Tompsett originated the role of Drew in the West End production of Rock of Ages. For this role he was nominated for the whatsonstage.com Theatergoers Choice Award for Best Actor in a Musical. Oliver left the show on 23 September 2012 when his contract ended.

On 12 September 2012 it was confirmed that Tompsett will replace Noel Sullivan as Galileo in We Will Rock You on 6 October 2012. For this part he was nominated for the whatsonstage.com Theatergoers Choice Award for Best Take Over in a Role. He remained with the show until its closure on 31 May 2014.

From November 2014 to 24 January 2015, Tompsett played the role of Phil Davis in the musical White Christmas alongside Darren Day in Leeds.

From 16 March to 14 August 2016, Tompsett played the role of Sky Masterson in the West End revival of Guys and Dolls following its transfer to the Phoenix Theatre in London. Tompsett reprised the role for the show's Israeli premiere at the Opera House in Tel Aviv for 10 performances.

On 20 November 2016, Tompsett starred alongside Seth Rudetsky, Jennifer Simard, Sally Ann Triplett, Alice Fearn, Sandra Marvin and Jodie Jacobs in two benefit gala performances of satirical comedy musical Disaster at the Charing Cross Theatre in London.

On 9 February 2017, Oliver and Michelle had a baby girl who they named Kaia.

In 2019, Tompsett joined the cast of & Juliet as Shakespeare.

Theatre Credits

Recordings 
In 2008 he recorded a song for the CD Act One – Songs From The Musicals Of Alexander S. Bermange, an album of 20 new recordings by 26 West End stars, released in October 2008 on Dress Circle Records. He can be heard on the recent Alexander S. Bermange CD singing "More than a Memory" and more.

In late 2008 he released his debut album entitled "Sentimental Heart", with all of the songs written, performed and produced by Tompsett.

Tompsett also recorded the song 'We Are Not Alone' on Terry Pratchett's 'Only You Can Save Mankind', which was released on 23 November 2009.

In May 2010, Tompsett announced on his Official Twitter account that due to the success of his début album, he had signed a record deal with Major Record Label Warner Brothers. His second album was released in 2011.

References

External links
Official MySpace Account
Oliver Tompsett on Twitter

1983 births
Living people
21st-century English male actors
21st-century English singers
21st-century British male singers
English male musical theatre actors
English male stage actors
People educated at the Arts Educational Schools
People from Oxfordshire